Cionomimus is a genus of true weevils in the beetle family Curculionidae. There are about 10 described species in Cionomimus.

Species
These 10 species belong to the genus Cionomimus:
 Cionomimus bimaculatus Anderson, 1997 c
 Cionomimus burkei Anderson, 1994 c
 Cionomimus championi Burke, 1981 c
 Cionomimus clarki Anderson, 1994 c
 Cionomimus dietzi Burke, 1981 i c
 Cionomimus grossus Anderson, 1994 c
 Cionomimus hansoni Anderson, 1997 c
 Cionomimus insolens (Dietz, 1891) i b
 Cionomimus obrieni Anderson, 1994 c
 Cionomimus woodi Anderson, 1994 c
Data sources: i = ITIS, c = Catalogue of Life, g = GBIF, b = Bugguide.net

References

Further reading

External links

Curculioninae
Articles created by Qbugbot